Lagoa dos Três Cantos is a municipality in the state of Rio Grande do Sul, Brazil.  As of 2020, the estimated population was 1,607.

Regional language

Like in many communities in the state of Rio Grande do Sul, Riograndenser Hunsrückisch has been part of its history since pioneering days.

See also
List of municipalities in Rio Grande do Sul

References

Municipalities in Rio Grande do Sul